The Zenair Zipper is a Canadian ultralight high-wing, single seat aircraft that was designed by Chris Heintz and produced by Zenair.

The Zipper is a highly innovative design that strongly emphasizes portability over speed or carrying capacity.

Development
The Zipper was designed in the early 1980s by established Canadian aircraft designer Chris Heintz and put into production by his company Zenair, of Midland, Ontario. Heintz's motivation for the Zipper was the ultralight aviation boom that was occurring in Canada at that time and the introduction of new aviation regulations by Transport Canada legally permitting the operation of ultralights.

The Zipper incorporates many unique features, all aimed at making the aircraft more portable. This focus was due to the nature of operations in the early days of the ultralight popularity. Aircraft were not flown great distances to fly-ins or other sites, but were transported by trailer or on car top to be flown locally at remote locations.

The Zipper has a quick-folding wing, built around a D-cell leading edge and spar. There are no wing ribs and the trailing edge of the wing is established by a cable which tensions the sailcloth wing covering. The wing is folded by releasing the anti-drag cables next to the nosewheel and folding the wings back along the tailboom, still supported by their struts. The wing is designed to +6 and -3 g.

The Zipper features conventional three-axis controls, which was unusual in ultralights designed at this time. The all-metal, one piece, all-flying rudder and the elevator are quickly removable for transport. The tailboom is aluminum and square in cross section.

The twin-engined Zipper II used a similar engine configuration to its competitor, the Ultraflight Lazair, placing both engines close together to minimize engine-out requirements.

Operational history
Zenith Aircraft Company President Sebastien Heintz, son of the designer Chris Heintz, learned to fly in a Zenair Zipper.

In December 2008 there were four Zippers still registered in Canada. Consisting of two Zippers, one Zipper-RX and one Zipper II

Variants
Zipper
Powerplant is one JPX PUL 425 or 212
Zipper-RX
Powerplant is one Rotax 277 engine of 28 hp
Zipper II
Powerplants are two JPX PUL 212. There were 12 built.

Specifications (Zipper PUL 425 engine)

See also

References

External links
Photo of twin-engined Zipper II
Photo of twin-engined Zipper II in flight
Photo of single engined Zipper
Detail photo of Zipper tail boom and controls
Documentary about the Zenair Zipper from 1984

1980s Canadian ultralight aircraft
Homebuilt aircraft
Zipper
High-wing aircraft
Single-engined tractor aircraft